The King's Award for Voluntary Service, previously known as The Queen's Award for Voluntary Service, is an annual award given to groups in the voluntary sector of the United Kingdom. Winning groups are announced in the London Gazette on 2 June each year, the anniversary of the coronation of Elizabeth II. From 2023, the awards will be announced on 14 November, Charles III's birthday. 

The award is equivalent to the MBE and is the highest award that can be made to a voluntary group. The award is managed by the Department for Digital, Culture, Media and Sport.

History
The award was announced by Elizabeth II on 30 April 2002, in celebration of her Golden Jubilee, as part of her Golden Jubilee speech to the House of Lords and House of Commons.
The first awards were made in 2003.

In February 2023, it was announced by Charles III that he wished to continue his mother's legacy by giving his name to the awards.
The awards will be announced annually from 2023 on his birthday, 14 November.

Eligibility
With the majority of volunteers, groups of two or more people for volunteer work can be nominated, and more than half of the volunteers must have rights living in the UK. Their works must be on service, meets a need, supported, recognised and respected for and by the local community. The groups of volunteers must be running their service for three years or more.

Award
Nominations are made online and one award is given per three nominations on average. Winners receive a certificate signed by the King and a domed glass crystal. The volunteer group's representatives also may be invited to attend a royal garden party by the King.

Procedure for assessment and selection 
Each nomination is first appraised in the county where the group works. This appraisal is led by the Lord Lieutenant, His Majesty's representative in the county, helped by a County Assessment Panel of leading representatives from diverse sectors of the community. The Lord Lieutenant or their representatives, or both, may meet with the nominated group.

A Specialist Assessment Panel of independent volunteering experts from across the UK judge nominated groups against the Award criteria, taking into account the first appraisal. The panel passes its recommendations to the Main Award Committee.

The Main Award Committee advise the Cabinet Office and the Minister for Civil Society.

The award is decided after the King has given his formal approval.

Recipients
, over 1,500 groups had received the award, including:

Notes

References

External links
Gov.uk website
London Gazette page

British awards
Awards established in 2002
Humanitarian and service awards
2002 establishments in the United Kingdom